Leplaea is a genus of flowering plants belonging to the family Meliaceae.

Its native range is western Tropical Africa to Uganda. It is found in Cabinda Province (of Angola), Cameroon, Central African Republic, Congo, Equatorial Guinea, Gabon, Ghana, Guinea, Ivory Coast, Liberia, Nigeria, Sierra Leone, Uganda and Zaïre.

The genus name of Leplaea is in honour of Edmond Leplae (1868–1941), a Belgian agricultural engineer, professor of agriculture in Liège. 
It was first described and published in Rev. Zool. Bot. Africaines Vol.9 (Suppl. Bot.) on page 61 in 1921.

Known species
According to Kew:
Leplaea adenopunctata 
Leplaea cauliflora 
Leplaea cedrata 
Leplaea laurentii 
Leplaea mangenotiana 
Leplaea mayombensis 
Leplaea thompsonii

References

Meliaceae
Meliaceae genera
Plants described in 1921
Flora of West Tropical Africa
Flora of West-Central Tropical Africa